AS Corps Enseignement is a Malagasy football club based in Toliara, Madagascar.

The team plays in the Malagasy Second Division.

In 1974 the team has won the THB Champions League.

Achievements
THB Champions League: 3
1974, 1975, 1977

Performance in CAF competitions
CAF Champions League: 1appearance
1975 African Cup of Champions Clubs

References

External links

Corps Enseignement